Yarrella is a genus of lightfishes.

Species
There are currently two recognized species in this genus:
 Yarrella argenteola (Garman, 1899)
 Yarrella blackfordi Goode & T. H. Bean, 1896

References

Phosichthyidae
Marine fish genera
Taxa named by George Brown Goode
Taxa named by Tarleton Hoffman Bean